This is a list of lakes and tarns in North Yorkshire, England. Unlike the nearby Lake District, North Yorkshire does not have many natural lakes due to the porosity of the limestone underneath the surface. The JNCC Special Area of Conservation status for the Craven Limestone Complex lists running and standing Water at only 1%. Upland tarns are common where the underlying stone allows the water to collect. These tarns are usually surrounded by peat, so most have relatively acidic water in comparison to the alkaline nature of water which runs over Limestone common in the area.

Man-made reservoirs and dams, such as at Moss Dam in Swaledale, are not included, as the list focuses only on natural lakes and tarns. The list only covers those within Yorkshire, and sites such as Sunbiggin Tarn, whilst in the Yorkshire Dales National Park, are not included, as that body of water is in the county of Cumbria. Some tarns or lakes may no longer exist; historical documents refer to Giggleswick and Wigglesworth as having tarns - however,  these have either dried up or have been drained.

List

Notes

References

Sources

 
Landforms of North Yorkshire